Rail transport in Taiwan consists of  (as of 2015) of railway networks. Though no longer as dominant as it once was, rail transport is an extremely important form of transportation in Taiwan due to high population density, especially along the densely populated western corridor. In 2016, over 1.09 billion passengers traveled by rail in Taiwan, averaging 2.99 million passengers per day.

The railways of Taiwan include conventional rail, rapid transit systems, and high-speed rail, as well as specialized railways for tourists and industry. Taiwan Railways Administration is an associate member and Taiwan High Speed Rail is an active member of the International Union of Railways (UIC), even though Taiwan does not have state membership.

Rail transport was introduced to Taiwan in 1891 during its late Qing era. Push car railways were brought to Taiwan during Japanese rule and were in general service from 1895 to the late 1940s.

All railway services are located in the main island of Taiwan. Outer islands including Penghu, Kinmen, and Matsu Islands do not have railways.

Intercity railways
There are two railway systems that provide intercity transportation service in Taiwan:

The Taiwan Railways is administered by the governmental agency Taiwan Railways Administration. TRA operates both passenger service and the only freight service in the country. The main lines form a loop around the island that connects most of the country's major cities, with small branch lines at various points to the interior. TRA operates both intercity trains throughout Taiwan, and commuter services into the major cities. The Taiwan High Speed Rail is operated by a franchised private company called Taiwan High Speed Rail Corporation, it contains passenger services between Nangang, Taipei and Zuoying, Kaohsiung with a route that runs through Western Taiwan.

Urban transit

Urban rail transit systems are managed by local governments. There are currently five operators in Taiwan's major urban centers.

Most of the urban rail transit systems use standard gauge , except Taipei Metro Wenhu line, which uses VAL system with  track gauge. The main line of Taoyuan Metro is called the Taoyuan Airport MRT, which connects Taoyuan International Airport, Taiwan's largest airport, with Taipei and Zhongli, Taoyuan. In addition to the five systems above, there were also plans to built rapid transit systems in municipalities of Tainan and Hsinchu. However, the Ministry of Transportation and Communications declined the proposals in January 2010 for budget issues and deeming it premature. Recently, most plans of new urban rail transit system plans have adopted light rail for budget efficiency.

Industrial and tourist railways

Industrial railways were built mainly in the Japanese era for transporting industrial raw materials and products, especially sugarcanes for sugar industry, and lumber for wood industry in Taiwan. After World War II, these industries declined significantly and these railroads were remodeled as tourist attractions in the beginning of 21st century.

The Taiwan Sugar Railways is an extensive series of narrow gauge lines mostly in central and southern Taiwan, originally built to haul sugarcane by the sugar companies in Japanese era, but also capable of providing limited passenger service. Regular passenger services discontinued in 1982. In 2003, some short-distance train services resumed. Currently there are six lines in operations.

Only Magongcuo line in Huwei Sugar Refinery is still under industrial use, other five lines have been transformed to heritage railways.

The Forest Railways were built for logging and timber industry, now recommissioned as tourist railway services in high mountains.

The Alishan Forest Railway is currently the largest tourist railway networks in Taiwan, operated by Taiwan Railways Administration. The Luodong Forest Railway and Taiping Mountain Forest Railway were interconnected to transport the harvested lumber from Taiping Mountain to Luodong, Yilan and transferred to major railway system of Taiwan. Now only a short  section near Tiansongpi Station are operating. Wulai Scenic Train was originally tracks for rail push trolleys, now runs a light automotive for tourists.

Track gauge
The earliest railway in Taiwan was completed in 1893 under the auspices of Governor Liu Mingchuan during the Qing Era and rebuilt by the Governors-General during the Japanese Era (see Taiwan Railways Administration§History). Since then, major railways in Taiwan have followed the  gauge standard. The Taiwan High Speed Rail and all rapid transit systems use standard gauge track.

Cultural

Because of Taiwan's extensive rail network (including many now defunct industrial narrow gauge lines which provided passenger service to rural areas), railways in Taiwan often have a romantic connotation, especially amongst the older generation who remember growing up when rail travel was the primary means of transportation between cities in simpler (and less prosperous) times. Many remember leaving their hometowns to attend school in far away cities by train or leaving via train to perform their compulsory military service.

Railfan culture

Taiwan also has a rail enthusiast culture that dates back to 9 June 1988, when the National Chiao Tung University's , the first college student club in Taiwan, was established, with its first leader being Jen Heng-yi. Jen and his fellow club members would work to publish what became the first issue of the popular long-running railfan publication Rail News in 1989. The success the club had with other local railfans was followed by the establishment of similar clubs in other Taiwanese universities such as in the National Taiwan University and Tamkang University in Taipei, as well as one at National Cheng Kung University in Tainan. The first private rail association, Railway Culture Society was subsequently established in 1995 after Jen and other founders of the Rail Institute transitioned away from student life.

Some prominent railway enthusiasts in Taiwan include assistant professor  of the National Taiwan Normal University and technical assistant professor  of the National Kaohsiung University of Hospitality and Tourism.

See also
 List of railway stations in Taiwan
 Taiwan Railways Administration
 Transportation in Taiwan

Notes

References

Further reading

External links

Taiwan railway scenery
Twilight zone in Taiwan (Japanese)